Jam Bozorgi (also Romanized as Jām Bozorgī; also known as Jāmeh Bozorgī) is a village in Kazerun County, Fars Province, Iran. At the 2006 census, its population was 921, in 182 families.

References 

Populated places in Kazerun County